Leaps and Bounds was a chain of indoor play-places that was started by McDonald's in 1991. The main attraction was a tube maze complex with ball pits. They hosted children's birthday parties where pizza and cake were served. There were arcade-style games that awarded tickets for cheap prizes.

Leaps and Bounds  of two tubes with a block and circle in the middle on the front of the building to resemble the tube maze the play-place had featured. "Play with Purpose" was their slogan.  It merged with competitor Discovery Zone in 1995.

References

Entertainment companies established in 1991
Entertainment companies disestablished in 1995
Defunct companies based in Illinois
Former McDonald's subsidiaries
1991 establishments in the United States